Imar or IMAR may refer to:
Emar, an ancient Amorite city located in modern-day Syria
Ímar, a 9th-century Norse king
Ímar (band), a musical group from the British Isles
Ímar of Limerick, Viking ruler
Imar the Servitor, 1914 American film
Inner Mongolia Autonomous Region of China
Institute of Mathematics of the Romanian Academy (IMAR), in Bucharest, Romania